The Sialkot–Zafarwal Road is a dual highway running between the Pakistani cities of Sialkot and Zafarwal.

References 

Highways in Punjab
Roads in Punjab, Pakistan
Transport in Punjab, Pakistan